Daniele Pinto (born 9 May 1986) is an Italian professional footballer who plays as a midfielder for Serie C club A.S. Giana Erminio.

Club career
Pinto started his career on Italian Eccellenza, and on the 2011–12 season signed for Promozione club Giana Erminio. He won the promotion on his first season, and after that the promotion to Serie D on 2012-13 Eccellenza season. Pinto don't played on Serie D, and leave the football on 2013–14 season and accept a job as Director of a store in Inzago, Milan.

He return to recently promoted Giana Erminio on 2014–15 Lega Pro, current Serie C, and he's the captain of the club since 2018.

References

External links

1986 births
Living people
People from Vimercate
Italian footballers
Association football midfielders
Serie C players
Eccellenza players
Promozione players
A.S. Giana Erminio players
Footballers from Lombardy
Sportspeople from the Province of Monza e Brianza